James Millar (4 May 1876 – January 1932) was a Scottish professional footballer who played as a half back.

Career
Millar spent his early career with Elgin City, Rangers, Port Glasgow Athletic and Middlesbrough. At Rangers he played as an "attacking wing half" and won the Scottish Football League title in his one full season, 1898–99, playing in the final five of the 18 fixtures – all of which Rangers won. For Middlesbrough, he made 20 appearances in the Football League; he also made 3 FA Cup appearances.

He joined Bradford City in June 1903, becoming one of the club's first professional players. He was a "popular figure" and was elected by his teammates to serve as vice-captain to both Johnny McMillan and Fred Halliday. He played in City's first ever Football League match on 1 September 1903, against Grimsby Town, playing as centre-half in that game. He spent most of his time with City playing as a half back. He retired due to injury in 1907, having made 118 league and 11 FA Cup appearances. In 1909, Bradford City gave him a benefit match (shared with George Robinson). That same year he returned to football, playing with Aberdeen until 1912.

Millar later worked as a sheep farmer in Australia, before dying in Michigan in January 1932, aged 55. Millar was also a "fine landscape painter".

Sources

References

1876 births
1932 deaths
Scottish footballers
People from Elgin, Moray
Elgin City F.C. players
Rangers F.C. players
Port Glasgow Athletic F.C. players
Middlesbrough F.C. players
Bradford City A.F.C. players
Aberdeen F.C. players
Scottish Football League players
English Football League players
Association football wing halves
Scottish emigrants to Australia
Scottish emigrants to the United States
Australian sheep industry
Scottish landscape painters
Sportspeople from Moray